The 1990 Fiji rugby union tour of Hong Kong and France was a series of matches played in December  1990 in Hong Kong and France by Fiji national rugby union team.

The matches played in France were valid for the "Toulouse Centenary International Masters".

Results

Fiji
tour
Fiji national rugby union team tours
Rugby union tours of France
Rugby union tours of Hong Kong